El gran León is a 2017 Peruvian romantic comedy film directed by Ricardo Maldonado and written by Marcos Carnevale & Hernan Rebalderia. It stars Carlos Alcántara and Gianella Neyra. It was released on December 28, 2017 in Peruvian theaters. This film is a remake of the Argentina film Heart of a Lion.

Synopsis 
León Godoy measures one meter thirty-six centimeters and is not intimidated by anyone. Less so before Ivana Cornejo, a beautiful divorced lawyer whom he meets by chance in life and with whom an immediate connection arises. Both must face and combat social prejudices -their own and others-, to verify that great love stories always present themselves in the least imagined ways.

Cast 

 Carlos Alcántara as León Godoy
 Gianella Neyra as Ivana Cornejo
 Cristian Rivero as Diego Bisoni
 Hernán Romero as Ernesto
 Katia Condos as Sabrina
 Patricia Portocarrero as Corina
 Stefano Tosso as Toto
 Martha Figueroa as Adriana

Reception

Box-office 
The film brought 45,566 people to theaters on its first day, ending its opening weekend with over 300,000 viewers.

Critical reception 
El Comercio negatively criticized the film, saying, "El gran León is the creative laziness of the director, who in most of the film is dedicated to tracing, sometimes shot by shot, the original version... In the original version, the main actor achieves a character full of charm, sympathy, intelligence, and even a share of sadness, melancholic or sentimental reverie more typical of a good classic comedy. Alcántara, on the other hand, without the possibility of going very far with respect to his register of 'stand-up comedy' or of Creole picaresque, looks uncomfortable, limited, wrapped in a character that he does not understand".

References

External links 

 

2017 films
2017 romantic comedy films
Peruvian romantic comedy films
Tondero Producciones films
2010s Peruvian films
2010s Spanish-language films
Films set in Peru
Films shot in Peru
Films about dwarfs
Remakes of Argentine films